Argynnis laodice,  Pallas' fritillary,  is a butterfly of the family Nymphalidae. It occurs in damp forested places in southern Scandinavia, Eastern Europe, northwestern Kazakhstan, and across the Palearctic to Siberia , Amur, Korea and Japan.

Description
laodice Pall. (= cethosia Hbn.) (70a). Bright leather-yellow, the female with minute white spots before the apex of the forewing. Central and distal areas with very regular rows of round black dots. Underside without silver, a row of elongate white spots with an oily gloss separates on the hindwing the yellow proximal area which has a greenish gloss, from the distal area, which is dusted with pinkish violet.

Biology
Larvae feed on species of Viola. The species produces one generation annually and flies in July–August.

References 

Argynnis
Butterflies of Europe
Butterflies of Indochina
Butterflies described in 1771
Taxa named by Peter Simon Pallas